The rete ovarii is a structure formed from the primary sex cords in females.

It is the counterpart of the rete testis in males. It is a narrow hilus, at which nerves and vessels enter the ovary. In the medulla of the mammalian ovary near the hilus are small masses of blind tubules or solid cords—the rete ovarii—which are homologous (i.e., of the same embryonic origin) with the rete testis in the male. The microscopic right ovary of birds usually consists only of medullary tissue.

The rete ovarii is important in the control of meiosis in the maturing ovary. Cells of the rete ovarii also differentiate to form granulosa cells. The rete is also attributed with secretory capacity, a hypothesis supported by the observation of secretory material in the lumen of rete tubules in several species.

References

Embryology of urogenital system